Richard Smith (29 October 1877 – 10 December 1959) was an English professional footballer who played as a centre forward. He started his career with hometown club Workington before moving to Football League side Burnley in 1904.

References

1877 births
Sportspeople from Workington
English footballers
Association football forwards
Burnley F.C. players
Workington A.F.C. players
English Football League players
1959 deaths
Footballers from Cumbria